The Battle of Colberger Heide (also Kolberger Heide or Colberg Heath) took place on 1 July 1644 during the Torstenson War, off the coast of Schleswig-Holstein. The battle was indecisive, but a minor success for the Dano-Norwegian fleet commanded by Jørgen Vind, assisted by Grabow and King Christian IV, over a Swedish fleet commanded by Klas Fleming, assisted by Ulfsparre and Bjelkenstjerna.

Course of the battle
The Dano-Norwegian fleet consisted of 40 ships with about 927 guns, and the Swedish fleet consisted of 34 ships with 1018 guns and 7 fireships.

The Dano-Norwegian fleet, coming from the east, and the Swedish fleet, coming from the west, met just north of the island of Fehmarn (Femern). The Swedes turned and sailed south along the west side of Fehmarn, inshore of a shoal, while the Danes followed a little further offshore. The Swedes turned north and swung around before resuming their westward course alongside the Danes. As the battle progressed the fleets turned before the wind, north and then back east south of the island of Langeland. As they approached the island of Lolland the Swedes turned south and eventually ended up in Kiel Bay while the Danes continued south-east, anchoring to the east of Fehmarn.

Casualties
Neither side had lost a ship. Dano-Norwegian casualties were 37 killed and 170 wounded, and Swedish casualties were 32 killed and 69 wounded. Among the Dano-Norwegian casualties were commander Jørgen Vind, who died of his wounds soon after the battle, and the king, whose wounds included the loss of an eye.

Impact

While the Dano-Norwegian fleet gained a minor success when it subsequently managed to incarcerate the Swedish fleet at the Bay of Kiel, the battle was not decisive: in a subsequent encounter, the Dano-Norwegian navy was utterly defeated off the Fehmarn coast. The significance of the battle lies rather in it being retrospectively perceived as the last Dano-Norwegian victory over her long-time adversary, Sweden, in the two countries' struggle for control of the dominium maris baltici, as well as the heroization of the Dano-Norwegian king's personal commitment during the battle, memorized in the famous Marstrand painting and the first lines of the Danish royal anthym Kong Christian stod ved højen mast.

List of ships involved

Denmark-Norway 

First Squadron:
Patientia 48 (1st Sq. flag)
Oldenborg 42
Stormar 32 (Henrik Mund)
Fides 28
Svan 26 (Lucas Henriksen)
Prinds Christian (merchantman)
Lam 16
Havhest 14
Jomfrusvend 6
Ørn 4

Second Squadron:
Tre Løver 46
Lindorm 38
Kronet Fisk 20
Emanuel (merchantman)
Forgyldte Stokfisk (merchantman)
S. Jacob (merchantman)
S. Peter (merchantman)
Hvide Björn 14
Sorte Björn 14
Postillion 14

Third Squadron:
Trefoldighed 48 (3rd Sq. flag)
Pelican 36
Graa Ulv 30
Norske Løve 30
Neptunus 28
Sorte Rytter 24
Tvende Løver 22
Josua (merchantman)
Hollandske Fregat 12
Højenhald 8

Fourth Squadron:
St Sophia 40 (4th Sq. flag)
Tre Kroner 30 (Corfits Ulfeldt)
Delmenhorst 28 (Hans Knudsen)
Nelleblad 24
Røte Gans (merchantman)
Unge Ulv (merchantman)
Markat 16
Gak Med 12
Samsons Gallej 9
Flyvende Hjort 8

The Dano-Norwegian merchant ships averaged around 20 guns each.

Sweden 

Van:
Scepter 58 (Van flag)
Drake 40
Göteborg 36
Leopard 36
Rafael 36
Jupiter 34
Regina 34 (Abraham Duquesne)
Smålands Lejon 32
Katta 22
Tiger 18
Måne 16
2 fireships

Center:
Krona 68 (Center flag)
Nyckel 34
Stockholm 34
Samson 32
Apollo 26
Merkurius 26
Salvator 26
Vestervik 26
Vestgöta Lejon 26
Rekompens 22
Svan 22
St Jakob 12
2 fireships

Rear:
Göta Ark 72 (Rear flag)
Svärd 32
Mars 30
Andromeda 26
Jägare 26
Vesterviks Fortuna 24
Akilles 22
Enhorn 18
Falk 18
Gamla Fortuna 18
Papegoja 12
3 fireships

The fireships were named Meerman, Caritas, Meerweib, Bona, Jungru,  St Mikael and 1 other. 4 had previously been used as horse transports and were barely ready.

References 
Footnotes

General reference
 Naval wars in the Baltic 1559-1850 (1910) - R. C. Anderson

1644 in Denmark
Colberger Heide 1644
Colberger Heide
Colberger Heide
1644 in the Holy Roman Empire